

MPs by party

National Assembly (Serbia)